Jon Horton may refer to:

 Jonathan Horton, gymnast
Jon Horton (indoor football) for Saginaw Sting
Jon Horton (sportscaster), for World Class Championship Wrestling
Jon Horton (musician) in Panzer AG

See also
John Horton (disambiguation)